"Black-Eyed Susan" is a song recorded by Canadian country music group Prairie Oyster. It was released in 1994 as the third single from their fourth studio album, Only One Moon. It peaked at number 7 on the RPM Country Tracks chart in January 1995.

Chart performance

Year-end charts

References

1994 songs
1994 singles
Prairie Oyster songs
Arista Nashville singles
Songs written by Joan Besen
Songs written by Ron Hynes